Carmen Z. Lamagna (born 1 December 1956) is a Filipino academic. She is the current vice-chancellor of American International University Bangladesh (AIUB), appointed by the president of Bangladesh. She served as the president of Association of Universities of Asia and the Pacific (AUAP) and treasurer of International Association of University Presidents (IAUP).

Education and career
Lamagna earned her bachelor's degree in chemical engineering in 1978 from Adamson University, Manila.  She received three master's degrees from Philippine Normal University (1990), Rizal Technological University (1994), and University of the East (1995). In 2003, she obtained her Ph.D. in business administration from California Coast University.

Lamagna was a faculty member of Perpetual Help University (1978–1979) and AMA Computer College (1982–1994). She served as the project director of AIUB during 1994–1996 and as an assistant vice president of business development in AMA Computer College in 1996. She was appointed as the vice-chancellor of AIUB in 1997. She became the first female vice-chancellor of a university in Bangladesh.

Awards
Lamagna won the Presidential Award for Filipino Individuals and Organizations Overseas in 2006 by President of the Philippines Gloria Macapagal Arroyo. In 2012 she was named as one of the top 100 women of the world in the education category by the International Alliance of Women (TIAW).

References

Living people
1956 births
People from Manila
Academic staff of AMA Computer University
Filipino women academics
California Coast University alumni
Adamson University alumni
Philippine Normal University alumni
Rizal Technological University alumni
University of the East alumni
Academic staff of the American International University-Bangladesh